Shafiqullah Ansari  is an Indian politician. He was elected to the lower House of the Indian Parliament the Lok Sabha as a member of the Indian National Congress.

References

External links
Official biographical sketch in Parliament of India website

Indian National Congress politicians

Possibly living people
Indian National Congress politicians from Bihar